Carol Campbell may refer to:
Carol Campbell (actress) (born 1966), Afro-German actress, model and presenter
Carol Campbell (politician) (1940–2008), female Democratic politician in Philadelphia
Carroll A. Campbell Jr. (1940–2005), male Republican politician in South Carolina